Stephanie Putson (born August 1973) is an English film, television, and stage actress.

Born on Teesside, Steph graduated from the London Academy of Music & Dramatic Art (LAMDA) and after taking to the stage she gained her first screen role in the Tyne Tees Television serial The Gambling Man (1995) in which she had the lead role of Janie, opposite Robson Green. Since then, she has mostly appeared on television and stage.

Putson originated the part of Billy’s Mum in the London stage production of Billy Elliot the Musical, which ran from 2005 until 2016.

Filmography
The Gambling Man (1995) as Janie Waggett
Our Friends in the North: 1984 (1996) as Bernadette Cox 
A Touch of Frost:Penny for the Guy (1997) as Joy Anderton 
Internal Inferno (1998) as Sylvie Webster 
Heartbeat: Pat-a-cake (1998) as Karen 
Holby City: Staying Alive (1999) as WPC Gorse 
The Bill: Pond Life (1999) as Alison Dunbar 
Playing the Field (2000) as Heidi 
King Arthur (2004) as Lancelot's mother

Notes

External links
Stephanie Putson at IMDb
Stephanie Putson at digiguide.tv

1973 births
20th-century English actresses
Actors from County Durham
Living people
English film actresses
21st-century English actresses